Christian Brigham (born August 1, 1994) is an American professional wrestler. He is currently signed to WWE, where he performs on the NXT brand under the ring name Carmelo Hayes.

Hayes is a former one-time NXT Cruiserweight Champion and a former two-time NXT North American Champion, which he also has the longest combined reign for. Before signing with WWE, he performed on the independent circuit under the ring name Christian Casanova.

Professional wrestling career

Independent circuit (2014–2021) 
After being trained by Brian Fury, on April 12, 2014, Brigham made his professional wrestling debut for independent promotion Chaotic Wrestling, losing to Mikey Webb. Over the next few years, he worked for various promotions including Beyond Wrestling, where he won the Pride of New England Tournament for Tomorrow. On March 17, 2016, Brigham won the Chaotic Wrestling New England Championship. On March 16, 2018, Casanova won the Chaotic Wrestling Tag Team Championship alongside Tripilicious. On March 29, 2019, Casanova won the Chaotic Wrestling Heavyweight Championship for the first time, and on August 30, won it a second time, thus making him the Twelfth Triple Crown Champion in Chaotic Wrestling. On December 19, 2020, he won the Vacationland Cup while working for Limitless Wrestling.

WWE (2021–present) 
On February 12, 2021, Brigham signed a contract with WWE and was assigned to the WWE Performance Center. He made his in-ring debut on the June 1 episode of NXT under the name Carmelo Hayes, accepting Kushida's open challenge for the NXT Cruiserweight Championship, but was defeated. On the June 22 episode of NXT, Hayes had his second match, reminiscent of John Cena's SmackDown debut in 2002 against Kurt Angle, confronting and facing Adam Cole in a losing effort. In July, Hayes took part in the 2021 NXT Breakout Tournament, defeating Josh Briggs, Duke Hudson, and Odyssey Jones to win the tournament. On the September 14 episode of NXT, Hayes and a debuting Trick Williams maliciously attacked Hudson before his match, establishing themselves as a heel duo.

On the October 12 episode of NXT, Hayes successfully cashed in his Breakout Tournament contract on Isaiah "Swerve" Scott to win the NXT North American Championship. He made his first successful title defense on the November 23 episode of NXT against Johnny Gargano and Pete Dunne. After the match, Hayes, Tony D'Angelo, Bron Breakker and Grayson Waller brawled with Gargano, Dunne, Tommaso Ciampa and LA Knight, leading to a WarGames match at NXT WarGames on December 5, where Team 2.0 defeated Team Black and Gold. At New Year's Evil on January 4, 2022, Hayes defeated NXT Cruiserweight Champion Roderick Strong to unify the North American Championship and the Cruiserweight Championship, which was retired. Hayes was recognized as the final Cruiserweight Champion and continued as North American Champion. He retained the title against Cameron Grimes on February 15 at Vengeance Day and on the March 1 episode of NXT against Dunne. After the match, Hayes announced that he would be defending the title in a five-way ladder match at Stand & Deliver on April 2, where Grimes won the championship, ending his reign at 172 days. At Spring Breakin' on May 3, he failed to regain the title from Grimes in a triple threat match involving Solo Sikoa.At In Your House on June 4, Hayes defeated Grimes to regain the North American Championship. He then retained the title against Tony D'Angelo, Grayson Waller on July 5 at The Great American Bash, Giovanni Vinci on August 16 at Heatwave, and Ricochet on September 4 at Worlds Collide. On the September 13 episode of NXT, Hayes lost the championship to Sikoa, ending his second reign at 101 days. On the October 11 episode of WWE Main Event, Hayes made his main roster debut, defeating Cedric Alexander. At Halloween Havoc on October 22, he failed to regain the North American Championship in a ladder match. On the November 22 episode of NXT, he challenged new champion Wes Lee for the title in a losing effort. Hayes competed in the inaugural Iron Survivor Challenge at Deadline on December 10, which was won by Waller. Following this, Hayes would begin a feud with Apollo Crews, where they would trade victories with each other, leading to a two out of three falls match at NXT Vengeance Day, where Hayes defeated Crews in two straight falls. Later that night, Hayes and Williams confronted NXT Champion Bron Breakker following the latter's victory over Grayson Waller, teasing a future match between the two. After weeks of teasing, the match between Hayes & Breakker for the NXT Chanpionship was confirmed for NXT Stand & Deliver.

Other media 
This year it was announced that Carmelo Hayes made his first video game debut in WWE 2K23 alongside his in ring alliance partner Trick Williams (as Trick Williams unlike Carmelo Hayes is a DLC) on the video game on the WWE NXT roster.

Championships and accomplishments
 Beyond Wrestling
 Pride of New England Tournament for Tomorrow (2019)
 Chaotic Wrestling
 Chaotic Wrestling Heavyweight Championship (2 times)
 Chaotic Wrestling New England Championship (1 time)
 Chaotic Wrestling Tag Team Championship (1 time)
 Twelfth Triple Crown Champion
 Liberty States Pro Wrestling
 Liberty States Heavyweight Championship (1 time)
 Limitless Wrestling
 Limitless Wrestling World Championship (1 time)
 Vacationland Cup (2020)
 Lucky Pro Wrestling
 LPW Tag Team Championship (1 time) – with Elia Markopoulos
 Pro Wrestling Illustrated
 Ranked No. 77 of the top 500 singles wrestlers in the PWI 500 in 2022
Northeast Championship Wrestling
 NCW New England Championship (1 time)
 Northeast Wrestling
 NEW Live Championship (1 time)
WWE
 NXT North American Championship (2 times)
 NXT Cruiserweight Championship (1 time, final)
 NXT Breakout Tournament (2021)

References

External links
 
 
 
 

1994 births
Living people
21st-century professional wrestlers
American male professional wrestlers
African-American male professional wrestlers
People from Framingham, Massachusetts
NXT North American Champions
NXT/WWE Cruiserweight Champions